Mahfuza is a Bangladeshi feminine given name. Notable people with the name include:

Mahfuza Akhter (born 1990), Bangladeshi football administrator, member of FIFA Council
Mahfuza Khatun (born 1967), Bangladeshi swimmer

Feminine given names